James Rowinski (born January 4, 1961)  is an American former professional basketball player.

College career
Rowinski, a 6'8" 250 lb center, attended and played collegiately at Purdue University. Along with standout freshman and fellow center, Russell Cross, he helped lead the Boilers to a 21-11 record and to a third-place finish in the NIT under first year head coach, Gene Keady. During his sophomore season at Purdue, Jim helped them to an NIT Finals appearance. In his Junior season, he led Purdue to the second round of the 1983 NCAA Tournament. After Russell Cross left for the NBA after his junior season, Rowinski became the starting center for the Boilermakers. During his senior season, he led the Boilers to a Co-Big Ten Conference title, a berth in the 1984 NCAA Tournament and an overall record of 22-7 for the season, averaging 15 points a game on the season. Jim was named First Team All-Big Ten and was also selected a team co-MVP with point guard, Ricky Hall. he was rewarded the Chicago Tribune Trophy, which is given the Big Ten's Most Valuable Player. He is one of three Purdue players to have been awarded this trophy; along with Rick Mount (1969, 1970) and Glenn Robinson (1994) were also recipients.-->

Professional career
Jim Rowinski was drafted by the Utah Jazz in the fourth round of the 1984 NBA Draft. Although he did not play his drafted season, Jim eventually began his NBA career in 1988 with the Detroit Pistons and on through to 1990 with the Philadelphia 76ers and the Miami Heat. His NBA career lasted 23 games over two seasons, where he averaged 2.5 points and 1.5 rebounds a game, along with an 84.4 percent at the free throw line and a 41.7 field goal percentage.

References

External links
NBA statistics @ basketballreference.com
Spanish League profile

1961 births
Living people
American expatriate basketball people in Belgium
American expatriate basketball people in Spain
American expatriate basketball people in Turkey
American men's basketball players
Basketball players from New York (state)
CB Breogán players
Centers (basketball)
Detroit Pistons players
Karşıyaka basketball players
Liga ACB players
Miami Heat players
People from Long Island
Philadelphia 76ers players
Purdue Boilermakers men's basketball players
Syosset High School alumni
Topeka Sizzlers players
United States Basketball League players
Utah Jazz draft picks
Yakima Sun Kings players